The Reynolds House, currently the Reynolds House Inn, is a historic house at 102 South Main Street in the city of Barre, Vermont.  Built in the 1890s, it is a well-preserved high-style example of Late Victorian architecture, exhibiting both Queen Anne and Second Empire features.   Built for a local merchant, it is a rare survivor of what was once a series of high-profile residences south of downtown Barre.  It was listed on the National Register of Historic Places in 2020.

Description and history
The Reynolds House is located south of downtown Barre, occupying a roughly triangular plot at the junction of South Main Street (Vermont Route 14) and Hill Street.  It is a large -story wood-frame structure, with a mansard roof and shingled exterior.  An ell extends from the main block, joining it to a period carriage barn.  Prominent features include a round turret at the northwest corner, a single-story porch with turned balustrade across most of the main facade and ell, and a rounded projecting bay.  The interior retains many original features, including chandeliers, builtin cabinets, and trim.

The house was built in the 1890s for George J. Reynolds, a Massachusetts native who married a woman from Barre and operated a general store in downtown Barre.  Reynolds' neighbors included a mayor of the city and owners of some of the local granite quarries.  As the latter business came to dominate the city's economy, Reynolds' business changed to serve both that business and its workers.  Reynolds was a significant force in the development of downtown Barre, serving on the boards of numerous local banks and businesses.  The house remained in the family until 1995; the carriage barn suffered damage by fire in 2014.

See also
National Register of Historic Places listings in Washington County, Vermont

References

External links
Official web site

Houses on the National Register of Historic Places in Vermont
National Register of Historic Places in Washington County, Vermont
Victorian architecture in Vermont
Houses completed in 1898
Buildings and structures in Barre (city), Vermont